The Schwarzhorn is a mountain of the Swiss Pennine Alps, overlooking the Augstbord Pass in the canton of Valais. It lies on the range between the Turtmanntal and the Mattertal.

References

External links
 Schwarzhorn on Hikr

Mountains of the Alps
Alpine three-thousanders
Mountains of Switzerland
Mountains of Valais